Del Aire (Spanish for "Of The Air") is a census-designated place (CDP) in the inland South Bay, Los Angeles County, California, United States, between El Segundo and Hawthorne. The population was 10,001 at the 2010 census, up from 9,012 at the 2000 census.

Del Aire is a small unincorporated residential neighborhood next to the Interstate 405/Interstate 105 interchange. It consists of two roughly rectangular shaped parts:
 one to the northwest bounded by I-105 and the City of Los Angeles on the north, El Segundo on the west, Hawthorne on the east, and El Segundo Blvd. on the south, and 
 one to the southeast bounded by El Segundo Blvd. on the north and surrounded by Hawthorne on the east, south and west. 
The two parts are connected by a sliver of land across El Segundo Blvd.

The Los Angeles Airport Courthouse is in the Del Aire CDP. The Aviation/LAX station on the Metro Green Line light rail is in Los Angeles proper, adjacent to the CDP, and the Los Angeles Air Force Base is in El Segundo, adjacent to Del Aire CDP.

Geography
Del Aire is located at  (33.916138, -118.369282).

The precise boundaries of Del Aire are complex, but can be roughly described as the area south of Imperial Highway between Aviation Boulevard and the San Diego Freeway(I-405) to El Segundo Boulevard. The CDP also includes the area east of the freeway and west of Inglewood Avenue, roughly between El Segundo Boulevard and Rosecrans Avenue, designated "Wiseburn" by L.A. County.

Education
All of Del Aire is part of the Wiseburn Unified School District. Schools that are part of the Wiseburn School District that are in Del Aire are Juan De Anza Elementary (K-5th Grade) and Da Vinci Design Charter School (9-12).

Juan Cabrillo Elementary (K-2), 138th Street Elementary (3-5), Richard Henry Dana Middle School and Da Vinci Science Charter School are south of Del Aire in the Hawthorne community known as Holly Glen.

Previously portions of Del Aire to the south were covered by the Lawndale Elementary School District and the Centinela Valley Union High School District. Additionally, when Wiseburn was only an elementary school district, Centinela Valley UHSD served as the high school district for that area. Wiseburn USD became a unified district, and therefore left Centinela Valley UHSD, in 2014. In 2021 a block of unincorporated areas that was in the Lawndale School District and Centinela Valley USD voted on a proposal on whether it should move to Wiseburn USD; previously students living in the block living in Wiseburn would have had to get permission from their zoned school districts to attend Wiseburn. According to Hunter Lee the Daily Breeze, "few" people voted in the election. The vote to transfer the area to Wiseburn was approved.

Demographics

2010
The 2010 United States Census reported that Del Aire had a population of 10,001. The racial makeup of Del Aire was 6,052 (60.5%) White (34.6% Non-Hispanic White), 458 (4.6%) African American, 60 (0.6%) Native American, 922 (9.2%) Asian, 131 (1.3%) Pacific Islander, 1,815 (18.1%) from other races, and 563 (5.6%) from two or more races. Hispanic or Latino of any race were 4,724 persons (47.2%).

The census reported that 9,989 people (99.9% of the population) lived in households, 9 (0.1%) lived in non-institutionalized group quarters, and 3 (0%) were institutionalized.

There were 3,291 households, out of which 1,220 (37.1%) had children under the age of 18 living in them, 1,764 (53.6%) were opposite-sex married couples living together, 420 (12.8%) had a female householder with no husband present, 191 (5.8%) had a male householder with no wife present.  There were 197 (6.0%) unmarried opposite-sex partnerships, and 26 (0.8%) same-sex married couples or partnerships. 674 households (20.5%) were made up of individuals, and 213 (6.5%) had someone living alone who was 65 years of age or older. The average household size was 3.04. There were 2,375 families (72.2% of all households); the average family size was 3.56.

The population was spread out, with 2,328 people (23.3%) under the age of 18, 956 people (9.6%) aged 18 to 24, 3,049 people (30.5%) aged 25 to 44, 2,607 people (26.1%) aged 45 to 64, and 1,061 people (10.6%) who were 65 years of age or older. The median age was 36.0 years. For every 100 females, there were 100.5 males. For every 100 females age 18 and over, there were 97.3 males.

The homeowner vacancy rate was 0.5%; the rental vacancy rate was 5.2%. 7,413 people (74.1% of the population) lived in owner-occupied housing units and 2,576 people (25.8%) lived in rental housing units.

During 2009–2013, Del Aire had a median household income of $80,833, with 9.1% of the population living below the federal poverty line.

2000
As of the census of 2000, there were 9,012 people, 2,871 households, and 2,190 families residing in the CDP. The population density was 9,110.7 inhabitants per square mile (3,514.7/km). The racial makeup of the CDP was 36.97% White, 32.18% Black or African American, 0.64% Native American, 8.08% Asian, 0.80% Pacific Islander, 10.72% from other races, and 5.60% from two or more races. About 17.62% of the population were Hispanic or Latino of any race.

There were 2,871 households, out of which 40.5% had children under the age of 18 living with them, 58.2% were married couples living together, 12.0% had a female householder with no husband present, and 23.7% were non-families. 18.3% of all households were made up of individuals, and 7.1% had someone living alone who was 65 years of age or older. The average household size was 3.13 and the average family size was 3.57.

In the CDP, the population was spread out, with 28.3% under the age of 18, 7.6% from 18 to 24, 33.0% from 25 to 44, 20.9% from 45 to 64, and 10.3% who were 65 years of age or older. The median age was 35 years. For every 100 females, there were 100.4 males. For every 100 females age 18 and over, there were 96.7 males.

The median income for a household in the CDP was $55,186, and the median income for a family was $59,444. Males had a median income of $40,693 versus $34,891 for females. The per capita income for the CDP was $20,726. About 3.3% of families and 5.7% of the population were below the poverty line, including 3.7% of those under age 18 and 10.5% of those age 65 or over.

Infrastructure
The Los Angeles County Sheriff's Department operates the South Los Angeles Station in Westmont, California, serving Del Aire.

Government

References

External links
 http://delairecommunity.blogspot.com/

Census-designated places in Los Angeles County, California
Census-designated places in California
South Bay, Los Angeles